Panja may refer to:

People 

 Ranjit Kumar Panja (1932–2006), Indian politician
 Ajit Kumar Panja (1936–2008), Indian politician
 Shashi Panja (born 1963), Indian politician
 Shibaji Panja, businessman from Kolkata
 Bulbuli Panja, Indian television actress

Places 
 Panja Sharif, Delhi, Delhi Karbala
 Panjas, French commune
 Gurdwara Panja Sahib, Sikh gurdwara

Festivals 
 Parwanaya, or Panja, festival in Mandaeism

Other 
 Panja Inc., a former name of AMX LLC, an American manufacturer of video switching and control devices